Cruel Intentions 2 (also known as Cruel Intentions 2: Manchester Prep or simply as Manchester Prep) is a 2000 American comedy-drama film written and directed by Roger Kumble, starring Robin Dunne, Sarah Thompson, Keri Lynn Pratt, and Amy Adams. It is a prequel to Cruel Intentions (1999) and was released direct-to-video on March 13, 2001. Both films are based on Les Liaisons dangereuses by Choderlos de Laclos.

Originally planned as a television series called Manchester Prep, a re-imagined prequel series to the first film, it was picked up by Fox, but was cancelled prior to broadcast in September 1999. Due to the cancellation, the three completed episodes were edited together into film retitled Cruel Intentions 2, and sexual content scenes involving nudity were added for the DVD release. This film is about how Sebastian Valmont and Kathryn Merteuil met and how they started their reign of terror.

Plot
Troublemaker student Sebastian Valmont is transferring to Manchester Prep following his father's new marriage to a wealthy divorcée. His current principal is adamant about having Sebastian's permanent record relayed to his new school, hampering his chance for a fresh start, but Sebastian retaliates by pulling a cruel stunt on his wife.

Upon his arrival in New York City, Sebastian discovers the wealth of his new family and first meets his deceitful and determined stepsister Kathryn Merteuil. He is quickly able to better her both at piano and vocabulary. This leads to a confrontation between Kathryn and Sebastian whereby she says he "better not interfere" with her comfortable lifestyle.

While waiting to meet his new headmaster, Sebastian encounters Danielle Sherman, who turns out to be Headmaster Sherman's daughter. Predictably, Sebastian swapped his permanent record for an excelling one before it was sent to the headmaster's office, and he can now start with a clean slate.

At the school assembly, Kathryn delivers a speech to her classmates. She is persistently interrupted by uncontrollable hiccups from a student, who then begins to choke on the gum that she was chewing to stop her hiccups. She is saved by the quick action of Danielle who performs the Heimlich, allowing her to expel the gum, which flies into Kathryn's hair. A meeting of a secret society of student elites, presided by Kathryn, takes place, deciding upon the fate of the new students. This leads them to Cherie, the student with the hiccups, as well as the discovery that Cherie's family is wealthier than that of Kathryn; this, along with the events of the assembly, causes Kathryn to seek a vendetta against Cherie.

Sebastian and Danielle quickly become friends and Sebastian develops a crush on her. They swap stories about their lives. Sebastian's mother was a drug addict and his parents split up when he was a child. His father was chartering boats in Miami, met Kathryn's mother and married her. Sebastian is living one day at a time with all that wealth. Sebastian and Kathryn are bickering step siblings. One night, Sebastian catches his father cheating on Kathryn's mother in his yacht with another woman.

Sebastian, being from a more humble upbringing, wishes to befriend the house staff. Doing so angers Kathryn, as she could not contact her driver. This, combined with her jealousy toward Sebastian, causes her to admit that she is unhappy with her life. Sebastian attempts to woo Danielle: first, asking her for coffee at her work; then later, calling. It eventually evolves into a relationship, but Kathryn, seeing this, uses it as a way to get back at Sebastian. She tries to lure him away from Danielle by tempting him with identical twins, who confide to Sebastian that Danielle is the only virgin at Manchester.

Kathryn's attempt to sabotage Cherie backfires, when Kathryn's mother tells her to befriend her, to encourage Cherie's mother to donate a large amount of money to the school. In the end, Sebastian stays with Danielle and professes his love for her, only to discover she does not reciprocate. In fact Danielle is alongside Kathryn in a secret plan to dupe Sebastian. Defeated, Sebastian states "if you can't beat them, join them", leading to a threesome with Danielle and Kathryn, followed by an alliance of the three to dominate and manipulate others.

In his limousine, Sebastian opens a gift from Danielle—a journal. While riding her bicycle, Cherie is nearly run over by Sebastian's limousine. After the driver offers Cherie a ride, Sebastian takes photographs of her and they eventually have sex, while in the front seat, Kathryn and Danielle exchange glances before smiling mischievously.

Cast

Production
Originally produced for the Fox network as television series titled Manchester Prep for the 1999–2000 television season, 13 episodes were ordered with original Cruel Intentions director Roger Kumble writing and executive producing the series. During production, the show was setback by conflicts between production company Columbia TriStar Television and the Fox network. Only the pilot and one further episode were filmed before the series was cancelled due to network executives uncertainty of the long term viability of the project. In addition to creative concerns, executives were also uncomfortable with the themes of teen sexuality and incest, with Rupert Murdoch, head of Fox parent News Corporation, said to be outraged after seeing a newsstory on Manchester Prep that previewed a scene in which one of the young female characters is sexually aroused by a horse. With the cancellation, Columbia TriStar Home Video repackaged the two existing episodes of the show as a direct-to-video film.

Soundtrack
In the film credits, Edward Shearmur's music from Cruel Intentions and Stephen Endelman's music from Jawbreaker are listed as being used in the film.

Other songs used in the film include:
 Thin Lizard Dawn - Weed
 Thin Lizard Dawn - "Under the Wing"
 Jessica Theely - "In Good Time"
 The Julie Band - "Bad Day"
 Cupcakes - "Blood Thirsty"
 Treble Charger - "Left Feeling Odd"
 Gearwhore - "Passion"
 Jessica Sheely - "No Regrets"
 Bernie Barlow - "I Wanna Know Where Nowhere Is"
 Thin Lizard Dawn - "Turn Yourself In"
 Michael Greenspan - "I Want You"
 Lorna Vallings - "Taste"
 Shelly O'Neil - "Best Friend"
 Shelly Peiken - "Good to Me"
 Shelly O'Neil - "Make It Happen"
 The Julie Band - "Julie Goes Home Now"
 Jessica Sheely - "Feel Something"
 The Smithereens - "All Revved Up"
 The Smithereens - "The Last Good Time"

Reception
Cruel Intentions 2 received generally negative reviews. On Rotten Tomatoes the film has an approval rating of 17% based on reviews from 12 critics.

See also
 List of television series canceled before airing an episode

References

External links
 
 

2000 films
2000 comedy-drama films
2000 direct-to-video films
2000 independent films
2000s American films
2000s English-language films
2000s teen comedy-drama films
2000s teen sex comedy films
American direct-to-video films
American independent films
American prequel films
American sex comedy films
American teen comedy-drama films
Direct-to-video comedy films
Direct-to-video drama films
Direct-to-video erotic films
Direct-to-video prequel films
Films about narcissism
Films about the upper class
Films about virginity
Films directed by Roger Kumble
Films produced by Neal H. Moritz
Films set in Manhattan
Films shot in Los Angeles
Films shot in New York City
Films shot in Toronto
Newmarket films
Original Film films
Sony Pictures direct-to-video films
Television pilots not picked up as a series
Works based on Les Liaisons dangereuses